A Helpful Sisterhood is a 1914 American film directed by Van Dyke Brooke.

Cast
Norma Talmadge as Mary
Mary Maurice as Grandmother
Marie Weirman as Sophie
Marie Tener as Louise
Mary Anderson as Alice
Leo Delaney as Detective
Van Dyke Brooke as Mr. Vardon
Arthur Cozine as John
Cortland Van Deusen as Bert
Ernest Cozzens

External links

1914 films
1914 drama films
American silent short films
1910s English-language films
American black-and-white films
1914 short films
Silent American drama films
Films directed by Van Dyke Brooke
1910s American films